Scolopia is an Old World genus of plants in the family Salicaceae.

Species include:

 Scolopia braunii (Klotzsch) & Sleumer - an Australian rainforest tree 
Scolopia buxifolia Gagnep.
Scolopia chinensis (Lour.) Clos
Scolopia crassipes Clos.
Scolopia crenata (Wight & Arn.) Clos
Scolopia erythrocarpa H. Perrier
Scolopia lucida Wall. ex Kurz
Scolopia mundii (Eckl. & Zeyh.) Warb. - a South African Afromontane forest tree
Scolopia oldhamii Hance
Scolopia oreophila Killick
Scolopia pusilla (Gaertn.) Willd.
Scolopia rhinanthera 
Scolopia saeva (Hance) Hance
Scolopia schreberi J.F.Gmel.
Scolopia steenisiana Sleumer  
Scolopia zeyheri (Nees) Szyszyl.

The caterpillars of the rustic (Cupha erymanthis), a brush-footed butterfly, utilize species of this genus as food plants.

 
Salicaceae genera
Taxonomy articles created by Polbot